The following is a complete list of the compositions by American composer Michael Torke.

By year of composition 

 Laetus (1982), for piano
 Ceremony of Innocence (1983), for flute, clarinet, violin, cello and piano
 Vanada (1984), for (brass, keyboards and percussion)
 Yellow Pages (1985), for flute, clarinet, violin, cello and piano
 The Harlequins Are Looking at You (1985), for piano trio
 The Directions (1986), chamber opera
 Adjustable Wrench (1987), for chamber ensemble
 Color Music (1985-1988)
 Ecstatic Orange (1985), for orchestra
 Bright Blue Music (1985), for orchestra
 Green (also known as Verdant Music) (1986), for orchestra
 Purple (1987), for orchestra
 Ash (1988), for orchestra
 Black and White (1988), for orchestra (ballet)
 Charcoal (1988), for orchestra
 Copper (1988), for brass quintet and orchestra
 Rust (1989), for piano, 11 wind instruments and electric bass
 Slate (1989), for 3 keyboards, 2 percussion and orchestra
 Mass (1990), for baritone, chorus and chamber orchestra
 Bronze (1990), for piano and orchestra
 Music on the Floor (1992), for chamber ensemble
 Chalk (1992), for string quartet
 Run (1992), for orchestra
 Monday and Tuesday (1992), for chamber ensemble
 Four Proverbs (1993), for female voice and chamber ensemble
 King of Hearts (1993), opera for television
 Chrome (1993), for flute and piano
 Piano Concerto (1993), for piano and orchestra
 Saxophone Concerto (1993), for soprano saxophone and orchestra
 Bone (1994), for chamber ensemble
 Javelin (1994), for orchestra
 Nylon for guitar and orchestra
 December (1995), for strings
 July (1995), for saxophone quartet
 Blue Pages (1995), for flute, clarinet, violin, cello and piano
 White Pages (1995), for flute, clarinet, violin, cello and piano
 Telephone Book (1995), for flute, clarinet, violin, cello and piano (Yellow Pages + Blue Pages + White Pages)
 Flint (1995), for two pianos, saxophone quartet, cello and double bass
 Book of Proverbs (1996), for soprano, baritone, SATB choir and orchestra
 Sprite (1996), for flute and piano
 Brick Symphony (1997), for orchestra
 Overnight Mail (1997), for 11 wind instruments, piano and double bass
 Change of Address (1997), for chamber ensemble
 Pentecost (1997), for soprano and orchestra
 Lucent Variations (1998), for orchestra
 Jasper (1998), for orchestra
 Strawberry Fields (1999), opera
 Four Seasons (1999), for soprano, mezzo-soprano, tenor, baritone, adult and children's choirs, and orchestra
 Corner in Manhattan (2000), for string quartet or orchestra
 Two Drinks (2000), for piano
 Grand Central Station (2000), for concert band
 Rapture (2001), for percussion and orchestra
 Five Songs of Solomon (2001), for soprano and piano
 Song of Ezekiel (2001), for SSA (soprano I, soprano II, alto) choir and piano
 An American Abroad (2002), for orchestra
 Song of Isaiah (2002), for soprano and chamber ensemble
 The Contract (2002), for orchestra (ballet)
 The Paradise Project (2002), music theatre piece for voices and tape
 August (2003), for brass quintet
 Bliss (2003), for concert band
 Kellisongs (2003) for soprano and piano
 Four Wheel Drive (2004), for concert band
 An Italian Straw Hat (2004), for orchestra (ballet)
 Two Girls on the Beach... (2005), for woodwind quintet
 After the Forest Fire (2005), for marimba, flute and cello
 Pentecost (2005), for soprano and orchestra
 The Kiss (2006), for concert band
 Heartland (2006), for orchestra
 Blue Pacific (2006), for piano
 Fiji (also known as Tropical) (2007), for chamber ensemble
 Central Park West (2007), opera
 Leda and Zeus (2007), for trombone and piano
 Plans (2008), for soprano, tenor, SATB chorus and orchestra
 Song of Ecclesiastes (2008), for baritone and piano
 Mojave (2009), for marimba and either string quartet or orchestra or wind instrument ensemble
 Cactus (2009), for harp, violin and orchestra
 Tahiti (2009), for chamber ensemble
 May and June (2010), for saxophone quartet
 Wild Grass (2011), for harp and wind instrument ensemble
 Tiger in the Sun (2011), for brass
 Torque Series (2012), for concert band
 Archipelago (2012), for orchestra
 Daffodils (2012), for flute and piano
 Pop-pea (2012), after Monteverdi, for rock band
 House and Home (2012), for soprano and piano
 The Bell Invites Me (2012), for carillon
 From Many, One (2012)
 Oracle (2013), for orchestra
 Bliss (2013), for concert band
 Iphigenia (2013), for 2 clarinets, 2 bassoons, 2 trumpets, cello and double bass
 Winter Trio (2013), for piano trio
 Concerto for Orchestra (2014)
 Miami Grands (2014), for ten pianos
 Winter's Tale (2014), for cello and orchestra
 Three Manhattan Bridges (2015), for piano and orchestra
 Unconquered (2016), for orchestra
 Spoon Bread (2016) for violin and piano
 West (2016) for bassoon and orchestra
 South (2016) for oboe and orchestra
 East (2016) for clarinet and orchestra
 Sylvan (2017) for orchestra
 Music at Night (2017) for SATB chorus and orchestra
 October (2017) for bass clarinet and string quartet
 Sky (2018) for violin and orchestra
 Being (2019) for chamber ensemble

References 

Torke, Michael